Petrophora is a genus of moths in the family Geometridae erected by Jacob Hübner in 1811.

Species
Petrophora binaevata (Mabille, 1869)
Petrophora chlorosata (Scopoli, 1763)
Petrophora convergata (de Villers, 1789)
Petrophora divisata Hübner, 1811
Petrophora narbonea (Linnaeus, 1767)
Petrophora subaequaria (Walker in D'Urban, 1860)

References

External links
 
 Fauna Europaea
 BioLib.cz

Ennominae
Taxa named by Jacob Hübner